Discoscapa apicula is an extinct species of crabronid wasp, formerly considered one of the two oldest-known species of bees. The species was described from an amber inclusion in Burmese Amber in 2020 by George Poinar Jr., a zoologist at Oregon State University. The fossil was found in a mine in the Hukawng Valley of northern Myanmar and is believed to date from the Cretaceous Period, 100 million years ago, the same age as Melittosphex burmensis, likewise previously considered the oldest known bee species; as it comes from the same amber deposit, these two specimens are considered to be the same approximate age. More recent research has concluded that D. apicula is a wasp belonging to the subfamily Crabroninae, placed in its own tribe, Discoscapini.

References

Apoidea
Burmese amber
Cretaceous insects of Asia
Prehistoric insects of Asia
Fossils of Myanmar
Fossil taxa described in 2020
Insects of Myanmar
Transitional fossils
Extinct wasps
Taxa named by George Poinar Jr.